The Eiksund tunnel is an undersea tunnel in Møre og Romsdal county, Norway, which runs under the Vartdalsfjorden connecting the municipalities of Ørsta and Ulstein.

Localities served
The tunnel was built as part of a large project including three tunnels and a bridge connecting several islands to the mainland. The bridge–tunnel complex serves the municipalities of Herøy, Sande, Ulstein, Hareid, Ørsta, and Volda, which together have over 40,000 inhabitants. The Eiksund Bridge joins Hareidlandet island and the village of Eiksund with the nearby island of Eika.  The Eiksund Tunnel begins at the south end of the bridge (on Eika island) goes under the Vartdalsfjorden and connects to the mainland near the village of Ørsta.

These three structures are a part of Norwegian County Road 653 (Fv653), a highway that links Fv61 between Ulstein and Herøy to the European route E39 highway between Ørsta and Volda.

Construction
The tunnel was originally intended to be opened to the public in July 2007, but numerous delays pushed the date back to December 2007 and then eventually to 2008. The tunnel was opened to traffic on 23 February 2008.

The Eiksund Tunnel is an undersea rock tunnel created by drilling and blasting, with 1,300 tonnes of explosive used. 660,000 cubic metres of rock were removed during construction.

Usage
The tunnel carries two lanes on the Ørsta side, and two lanes + one crawling lane on the Eiksund side. Prior to construction the average daily traffic through the Eiksund Tunnel was projected to be 1,000 vehicles per day (VPD). The ease of crossing the fjord, however, rapidly increased traffic to 2200 VPD. When the tunnel was fully financed after six years and became toll-free, traffic jumped again to 2880 VPD.

Incidents
On 28 June 2009, there was a severe accident in the tunnel, leaving five men dead. A young driver with three male passengers in their 20s was thought to have been driving at around 150-200 km/h (90-120 mph) when he hit the side of the tunnel and flipped his car over, which then struck an oncoming vehicle carrying only its driver.

See also
Extreme points of Earth
Rogfast, a deeper Norwegian undersea tunnel whose construction was halted in 2019.

References

External links
Road Traffic Technology - Eiksund Undersea Tunnel

Road tunnels in Møre og Romsdal
Subsea tunnels in Norway
Ulstein
Ørsta
2008 establishments in Norway
Tunnels completed in 2008